Fluviicoccus is a genus of bacteria which belongs to the class Gammaproteobacteria with one known species (Fluviicoccus keumensis). Fluviicoccus keumensis has been isolated from freshwater.

References

Monotypic bacteria genera
Moraxellaceae
Bacteria genera
Taxa described in 2016